The 2016 Six Nations Under 20s Championship was a rugby union competition held in    February and March 2016. Wales won the tournament, the Triple Crown and the Grand Slam.

Final table

Results

Round 1

Round 2

Round 3

Round 4

Round 5

References

2016
2016 rugby union tournaments for national teams
2015–16 in English rugby union
2015–16 in French rugby union
2015–16 in Irish rugby union
2015–16 in Welsh rugby union
2015–16 in Scottish rugby union
2015–16 in Italian rugby union
U-20
February 2016 sports events in Europe
 March 2016 sports events in Europe